Ragnar Prince Friedel Ache (born 28 July 1998) is a German professional footballer who plays as a forward for 2. Bundesliga club Greuther Fürth, on loan from Eintracht Frankfurt.

Career
Born in Frankfurt, Germany, Ache started his career in the youth ranks of Dutch side Sparta Rotterdam. He made his debut for the club's reserve side, Jong Sparta, in the Tweede Divisie on 20 August 2016 against TEC. He came on as a 66th minute substitute for Ugur Altintas and scored a goal in the 66th minute as Jong Sparta drew the match 2–2. He would go on to score seven goals in 17 appearances for the Sparta Rotterdam reserve side for the 2016–17 season.

On 4 April 2017, after good performances for Jong Sparta, Ache made his debut for the senior side in the Eredivisie against Heerenveen. He came on as substitute for Ilias Alhaft in the 80th minute as Sparta Rotterdam lost 3–0. That would be his only appearance with the senior side that season. At the start of the 2017–18 season, Ache was put into the first-team and came on as a substitute for Craig Goodwin in Sparta Rotterdam's 3–0 defeat at VVV-Venlo in the opening game of the season. On 25 August 2017, Ache scored his first two professional goals for Sparta Rotterdam, grabbing a brace in the club's 2–2 draw away at NAC Breda. Ache came onto the pitch in the 52nd minute with Sparta Rotterdam down 2–0 and scored in the 70th and 84th minutes of the match.

Eintracht Frankfurt
On 3 January 2020, Ache signed a five-year contract with German club Eintracht Frankfurt. He made his first appearance for the club on 25 September 2020 against Hertha BSC, coming on as a 66th minute substitute as Eintracht Frankfurt won 3–1.

On 14 June 2022, Ache was loaned to Greuther Fürth for the season.

International career
Born in Germany, Ache is of Ghanaian descent. He is a youth international for Germany.

In the opening game of Group D in the Men's Football at the 2020 Olympic Games in Tokyo on 22 July 2021, coming on as a substitute in the second half, Ache scored the second of Germany's two goals in a 4–2 loss to Brazil. Ache would score again in the second match, giving Germany a 2–1 lead in an eventual 3–2 win over Saudi Arabia.

Career statistics

Honours
Eintracht Frankfurt
UEFA Europa League: 2021–22

References

External links

1998 births
Living people
Footballers from Frankfurt
Association football forwards
German footballers
German sportspeople of Ghanaian descent
German expatriate footballers
Sparta Rotterdam players
Eintracht Frankfurt players
SpVgg Greuther Fürth players
Eredivisie players
Eerste Divisie players
Tweede Divisie players
Bundesliga players
2. Bundesliga players
Expatriate footballers in the Netherlands
Germany under-21 international footballers
German expatriate sportspeople in the Netherlands
Footballers at the 2020 Summer Olympics
Olympic footballers of Germany
UEFA Europa League winning players